The sharphead darter (Etheostoma acuticeps) is a species of freshwater ray-finned fish, a darter from the subfamily Etheostomatinae, part of the family Percidae, which also contains the perches, ruffes and pikeperches. It is endemic to the eastern United States, where it is only known to occur in the Holston and  Nolichucky River systems. It inhabits small to medium-sized rivers, being found in rocky riffles in deep, fast-flowing waters.

References

Freshwater fish of the United States
Etheostoma
Fish described in 1959
Taxonomy articles created by Polbot